St Mary, Our Lady of Victories Church is Roman Catholic Parish Church in Dundee, Scotland. It was built from 1850 and opened in 1851, twenty-seven years before the Restoration of the Scottish hierarchy. It is situated on Forebank Road, close to Ann Street. It is a Romanesque Revival church and a category B listed building.

History

Construction
Building work started on the church in 1850. In 1851, it was opened. The architect for the church was George Mathewson. He designed it to be in the style of Byzantine-Romanesque architecture.

Developments
From 1900 to 1901, the two towers and a narthex were added to the front of the church. They were designed by Thomas M. Cappon and built by William G. Lamond in the Art Nouveau style. In 1926, additions were made to the church, these were designed by Reginald Fairlie. These additions included multiple side chapels.

Parish
The church also serves St Patrick's Church in the city. St Patrick's Church is situated on Arthurstone Terrace in the Stobswell area of the city, built from 1897 to 1899, was also designed by Thomas Martin Cappon and is a category B listed building. St Patrick's has one Sunday Mass at 9:30am.

St Mary's Church has one Sunday Mass at 11:15am.

See also
 Roman Catholic Diocese of Dunkeld

References

External links
 St Mary, Our Lady of Victories & St Patrick's Parish site

Our Lady of Victories
Listed Roman Catholic churches in Scotland
Category B listed buildings in Dundee
Roman Catholic churches completed in 1851
19th-century Roman Catholic church buildings in the United Kingdom
1850 establishments in Scotland
Romanesque Revival church buildings in the United Kingdom